J. Malcolm Oades  is Director of the Waite Agricultural Research Institute at the University of Adelaide in Australia. He is a widely cited author and in 2001 won the ISI Citation Laureate award. In 2000 Professor Oades received a D.Sc. from the University of Leeds, England.

References

External links
 Oades profile: http://joomla.speedweb.com.au/soil2014/images/sampledata/stories/FEDERAL/PUBLICATIONS/Profile%20Newsletter/136Profiledec2003.pdf
 Waite history: https://issuu.com/universityofadelaidepress/docs/waite-extract
 Waite director: https://www.newscientist.com/article/mg15220577-600-changing-places/
 Order of Australia: http://www.theage.com.au/articles/2004/01/26/1074965445349.html, http://www.smh.com.au/articles/2004/01/25/1074965436108.html

Living people
Academic staff of the University of Adelaide
Year of birth missing (living people)
Members of the Order of Australia